Metarungia is a small Afrotropical genus in the family Acanthaceae of dicotyledonous flowering plants. They have large, colourful corollas, and are morphologically similar to Anisotes, which is also assumed to be bird-pollinated. They differ mainly in the dehiscence of the fruit capsule, and details of the placenta.

References

 
Acanthaceae genera
Flora of Africa